Merraul is a village in West Champaran district in the Indian state of Bihar.

Demographics
As of 2011 India census, Merraul had a population of 802 in 135 households. Males constitute 54.23% of the population and females 45.76%. Merraul has an average literacy rate of 62.6%, lower than the national average of 74%: male literacy is 57.17%, and female literacy is 42.82%. In Merraul, 11.4% of the population is under 6 years of age.

References

Villages in West Champaran district